Mizukami may refer to:

Mizukami, Kumamoto, a village in Kuma District, Kumamoto Prefecture, Japan
Mizukami Dam, a dam in Nagano Prefecture, Japan

People with the surname
, Japanese long-distance runner
, Japanese manga artist

Japanese-language surnames